The Bordj Bou Arreridj district is an Algerian administrative district in the Bordj Bou Arreridj province.  Its chief town is located on the eponymous town of Bordj Bou Arreridj.

Location 
The Bordj Bou Arreridj district is located in the center of the Bordj Bou Arreridj province.

Communes 
The district is composed of only one commune: Bordj Bou Arreridj.

References 

Districts of Ouargla Province

Districts of Bordj Bou Arréridj Province